Alexander Binder (born 1969 in Bad Ischl, Upper Austria) is an Austrian film director, cameraman and film producer.  His 2007 film "No Island: The Palmers Kidnapping of 1977" (German: "Keine Insel - Die Palmers Entführung 1977") has been noted in the New York Times.

Life 
Alexander Binder grew up in Hallstatt and Rosenheim. 
From 1991 to 1995, he studied at the Architecture at the Vienna University of Technology and  Philosophy at the University of Vienna.
From 1995 to 2003, he studied Film at the University of Music and Performing Arts.

Films (excerpt) 
Films of Alexander Binder as a director:

Documentaries:
 2013: "Raison dÉtat - The Principle of Lie"
 2010: "Zlin - The lived Utopia"
 2007: "No Island -  The Palmers Kidnapping of 1977"
 2006: "Nothing is more exciting than reality"
 2005: "Frequently Asked Questions"
 2003: "Stossek 68 – 86"

Short Films:
 1999:  '"WOLKENBÜGEL"
 1996:  "ÖSTERREICH IM HERBST 95"
 1996: Le Camelier
 1996: Dürre Dirne
 1995: Snakkerdu Densk in Allentsteig
 1991: SNAKE

Works of Alexander Binder as cameraman:
2015: "Oppenheim"
2014: "Hydra Alpe Adria"
2013: "Raison dÉtat - The Principle of Lie"
2010: "Wildbach Toni-Kritik der reinen Vernunft"
2006: Jeder siebte Mensch - "Every seventh person"
2006: "Nothing is more exciting than reality"
2005: Import Export Das Tier neben uns 
2003: Tosca (Band) – Wonderful
2001: Für einen Moment - "For a moment"
2001: Eine Hälfte der Nacht - "A half of the night"
1997: Tangram
1997: Die Bäder von Lucca - "The baths of Lucca"

Festivals and Prizes 

 Viennale, Festival der Nationen, Paris, Teheran, Triest, Winterthur, Leipzig
 Austin, Madrid Semana de Cine Experimental, Mar del Plata, Regensburg, Hamburg, Movcities  Vienna
 Kapfenberg, Hannover, Rotterdam, Amsterdam, Montecatini Therme, Mexico
 München Dokumentarfilmfest, Duisburger Filmwoche, Seine St. Denis
 Montpellier, London international Documentary Festival, 
 Winner Los Angeles Filmfestival
 Winner Golden Rhyon Sofia
 Honorable mention in Diagonale 2005 (Lobende Erwähnung Diagonale 2005)
 National Cultural Award for Talent in Upper Austria for experimental film
 "European Media Award" Golden Medal

Notes

References
 .

External links 
 Demokratie Masse Macht – Filmmuseum Vienna 
 Films – Films (1991–2005)
 News – Homepage

1969 births
Austrian documentary film directors
Austrian film producers
Living people